Temple and Cemetery of Confucius and the Kong Family Mansion in Qufu, Shandong Province of China, include Temple of Confucius, Cemetery of Confucius and the Kong Family Mansion.

Since 1994, the Temple of Confucius has been  part of the UNESCO World Heritage Site "Temple and Cemetery of Confucius and the Kong Family Mansion in Qufu". The two other parts of the site are the nearby Kong Family Mansion, where the main-line descendants of Confucius lived, and the Cemetery of Confucius a couple kilometers to the north, where Confucius and many of his descendants have been buried. Those three sites are collectively known in Qufu as San Kong, i.e. "The Three Confucian [sites]".

References

Qufu
World Heritage Sites in China
Tourist attractions in Shandong